742 Naval Air Squadron (742 NAS) was a Naval Air Squadron of the Royal Navy's Fleet Air Arm. It was active as a Communications Squadron and a Royal Navy Air Transport Squadron, operating in Sri Lanka during and after World War II.

History of 742 NAS

Communications Squadron (1943 - 1945)
742 Naval Air Squadron formed at RNAS Colombo Racecourse (HMS Bherunda), located in Cinnamon Gardens, Colombo, Sri Lanka, on the 6 December 1943, as a Communications Squadron. It was equipped primarily with Expeditor C.II and Beech AT.7 aircraft, however, it also operated a small number of Anson, Reliant, Sea Otter, Swordfish and Walrus. The squadron operated out of RNAS Colombo for the next nine months before moving to the Aircraft Repair Yard at Royal Navy Aircraft Repair Yard Coimbatore (HMS Garuda), in Southern India, on the 15 September 1944.

Air Transport Squadron (1945 - 1946)
It operated out of RNAS Sullur for approximately one year before moving to RNAS Katukurunda (HMS Ukussa) on the 26 February 1946. While based at Sullur, 742 NAS operated a detachment from Royal Naval Air Establishment Ratmalana (HMS Seruwa), located 10 miles south of Colombo, Sri Lanka, between the 1 November and the 1 December 1945. 'Round Robin' communication flights by the squadron regularly called at Ratmalana.

The squadron disbanded on the 31 August 1946 at RNAS Katukurunda.

Aircraft flown

The squadron has flown a number of different aircraft types, including:

Beech Expediter II
Beech AT-7 Navigator
Avro Anson
Stinson Reliant
Supermarine Sea Otter
Fairey Swordfish
Supermarine Walrus

Fleet Air Arm Bases 
729 NAS operated from a number of air bases:
Royal Naval Air Station COLOMBO RACECOURSE (6 December 1943 - 15 September 1944)
Royal Naval Aircraft Repair Yard COIMBATORE (15 September 1944 - 1 February 1945)
Royal Naval Air Station SULLUR (1 February 1945 - 26 February 1946)
Royal Naval Air Station KATUKURUNDA (26 February 1946 - 31 August 1946)

Commanders
742 NAS had a number of commanding officers:

Lt (A) T.N. Stack RNR (Dec 1943-Jan 1944)
Lt-Cdr (A) R. MacDermont RNVR (Jan 1944-Sep 1944)
Lt-Cdr (A) T.N. Stack RNR (Sep 1944-Aug 1946)

References

Citations

Bibliography

700 series Fleet Air Arm squadrons
Military units and formations established in 1943
Military units and formations of the Royal Navy in World War II